The Great Mirror of Male Love (男色大鏡 Nanshoku Ōkagami), with the subtitle The Custom of Boy Love in Our Land (本朝若風俗 Honchō Waka Fūzoku) is a collection of homosexuality stories by Ihara Saikaku, published in 1687. The collection belongs to Ihara's floating world genre of Japanese literature (浮世草子 Ukiyo-zōshi), and contains eight sections; each section contains five chapters, making 40 chapters in total.

Contents
The Great Mirror of Male Love has two parts: the first four sections (first 20 chapters) embody romantic relationships between warriors and monks; the next four sections center about the Kyoto-Osaka theatres, dealing with male loving stories about the kabuki actors. The stories are usually about homoerotic relationships between an adult male and an adolescent youth; the ethical constraints are very much like that of a man and a woman. In the first four sections, the samurai senior lovers are the image of manliness, supporter to the younger one, and the dominant role in sex. The young beloved boys are portrayed as beautiful, good students of the older samurai, and assume a submissive role in sex. From section 5 onward, the young kabuki actors are more like prostitutes to the older townsmen; however, recreational sex was taken for granted in Edo period Japan, therefore the relationship between the townsmen and the kabuki actors are still considered romantic accounts.

Preface
Saikaku claimed that heaven and earth in Japanese mythology are bound in the same way that two male lovers are bound. Women managed to capture the attention of men since the creation of the world, he added, but they were no more than an amusement to retired old men, and there was no way that women can be worthy enough to be compared to handsome youth.

Section One
Love: The Contest Between Two Forces
The ABCs of Boy Love
Within the Fence: Pine, Maple, and a Willow Waist
Love Letter Sent in a Sea Bass
Implicated by His Diamond Crest

Section Two
A Sword His Only Memento
Though Bearing an Umbrella, he Was Rained Upon
His Head Shaved on the Path of Dreams
Aloeswood Boy of the East
Nightingale in the Snow

Section Three
Grudge Provoked by a Sedge Hat
Tortured to Death with Snow on His Sleeve
The Sword That Survived Love's Flames
The Sickbed No Medicine Could Cure
He Fell in Love When the Mountain Rose Was in Bloom

Section Four
Drowned by Love in Winecups of Pearl Nautilus Shells
The Boy who Sacrificed His Life in the Robes of His Lover
They Waited Three Years to Die
Two Old Cherry Trees Still in Bloom
Handsome Youths having Fun Cause Trouble for a Temple

Section Five
Tears in a Paper Shop
He Pleaded for His Life at Mitsudera Hachiman
Love's Flame Kindled by a Flint Seller
Visiting from Edo, Suddenly a Monk
Voting Picture of Kichiya Riding a Horse

Section Six
A Huge Winecup Overflowing with Love
Kozakura's Figure: Grafted Branches of a Cherry Tree
The Man Who Resented Another's Shouts
A Secret Visit Leads to the Wrong Bed
A Terrible Shame He Never Performed in the Capital

Section Seven
Fireflies Also Work Their Asses at Night
An Onnagata's Tosa Diary
An Unworn Robe to Remember Him by
Bamboo Clappers Strike the Hateful Number
Nails Hammered into an Amateur Painting

Section Eight
A Verse Sung by a Goblin with a Beautiful Voice
Siamese Roosters and the Reluctant Farewell
Loved by a Man in a Box
The Koyama Barrier Keeper
Who Wears the Incense Graph Dyed in Her Heart?

Reception
The first release of The Great Mirror of Male Love was on the New Year Eve of 1687. The book was expected to be the best-seller of the year.

Translation
The first English translation of The Great Mirror of Male Love was by Paul Gordon Schalow. Schalow explained that there were two types of audiences for this collection: connoisseurs of boys (常人好き) and woman-haters (女嫌い). The former would be equivalent to bisexual in modern conception, and the latter would be equivalent to homosexual. Ihara structured the collection around the homosexual ethos of woman-hating, thus explaining the misogynist tone of the original work, which initially caused Schalow's translation to be offensive to women readers. Schalow purposely avoided using cultural phrases such as heterosexual, gay, or lesbian etc.

Notes
 Danly, Robert Lyons, The Journal of Asian Studies Vol.49 Issue 04, Cambridge.org. Retrieved 2012-10-24
 Ihara, Saikaku, The Great Mirror of Male Love. Translation and introduction by Paul Gordon Schalow. Stanford University Press. 1990

1687 books
1687 short story collections
1687 in Japan
1680s LGBT literature
17th-century Japanese literature
17th century in LGBT history
Books about actors
Casual sex in fiction
Edo-period works
Erotic short stories
Gay male erotica
Japanese short story collections
Kyoto in fiction
LGBT short story collections
Male homosexuality
Osaka in fiction
Short stories set in Japan
Works by Ihara Saikaku
Works set in theatres
LGBT literature in Japan